Inder Manocha (born 1968) is a British Asian stand-up comedian and actor.

Early life
Born in London to Indian parents, Manocha read Modern History at Jesus College, Oxford University and worked in international relations and as a therapist before deciding to work professionally in comedy and acting in 2001. Manocha is a member of the Baháʼí Faith.

Stand-up comedy
He began his stand-up career with great success by reaching the finals of So You Think You're Funny and the Hackney Empire New Comedy Acts of the Year, both in 2001.
Manocha's first one-man Edinburgh Festival show was in 2006.

Radio
 Freudian Slips Radio 4
 Beyond Belief Radio 5

Television
 Mega Mela Malai BBC (2001)
 Life Isn't All Ha Ha Hee Hee BBC 1 (2005)
 Waking the Dead BBC1 (2005)
 Holby City BBC1 (2006)
 Skins (played - "Anwar's dad") E4 (2007)

Movies
Filth and Wisdom
The Blue Tower

Print
 Baháʼí Art: Fact or Fiction? by Inder Manocha, Baháʼí Studies Review,  Vol.3.1, 1993

Awards
Winner of EMMA (Ethnic Multicultural Media Achievement Awards) Best Comedy/Comedian 2004

References

External links
 
 Comedy CV
 Oxford Student interview
 YouTube - BBC Asian Network

1968 births
Living people
20th-century Bahá'ís
21st-century Bahá'ís
English Bahá'ís
English people of Indian descent
English male actors of South Asian descent
English male comedians
English stand-up comedians
English male television actors
British male actors of Indian descent
Male actors from London
Alumni of Jesus College, Oxford
People educated at The John Lyon School
Date of birth missing (living people)